The 1928 United States presidential election in West Virginia took place on November 6, 1928, as part of the 1928 United States presidential election which was held throughout all contemporary 48 states. Voters chose eight representatives, or electors to the Electoral College, who voted for president and vice president. 

West Virginia voted for the Republican nominee, Secretary of Commerce Herbert Hoover of California, over the Democratic nominee, Governor Alfred E. Smith of New York. Hoover's running mate was Senate Majority Leader Charles Curtis of Kansas, while Smith ran with Senator Joseph Taylor Robinson of Arkansas.

Hoover won the state by a margin of 17.39 percent, with his margin undoubtedly enhanced by Appalachian anti-Catholicism against New Yorker Smith. This was the last time that a non-incumbent Republican won West Virginia until 2000. Hoover was the only Republican to carry Logan County until John McCain in 2008, the first-ever Republican victor in Wetzel County, the first Republican since Ulysses S. Grant in 1868 to carry Greenbrier County, and the first Republican since Abraham Lincoln in 1864 to carry Wayne County.

Results

Results by county

Notes

References 

West Virginia
1928
1928 West Virginia elections